Parens patriae is Latin for "parent of the nation" (lit., "parent of one's country"). In law, it refers to the public policy power of the state to intervene against an abusive or negligent parent, legal guardian, or informal caretaker, and to act as the parent of any child, individual or animal who is in need of protection.  For example, some children, incapacitated individuals, and disabled individuals lack parents who are able and willing to render adequate care, thus requiring state intervention.

In U.S. litigation, parens patriae can be invoked by the state to create its standing to sue; the state declares itself to be suing on behalf of its people. For example, the Hart-Scott-Rodino Antitrust Improvement Act of 1976 (15 USC 15c), through Section 4C of the Clayton Act, permits state attorneys general to bring parens patriae suits on behalf of those injured by violations of the Sherman Antitrust Act.

Discussion
Parens patriae relates to a notion initially invoked by the King's Bench in the sixteenth century in cases of non compos mentis adults.  The notion dates from at least 1608, as recorded in Coke's report of Calvin's Case, wherein it is said "that moral law, honora patrem… doubtless doth extend to him that is pater patriae."

The parens patrae doctrine was gradually applied to children throughout the seventeenth and eighteenth centuries, and has since evolved from one granting absolute rights to the sovereign to one more associated with rights and obligations of the state and courts towards children and incapacitated adults.

Many jurisdictions incorrectly apply the "best interests" standards in family law cases however, the Supreme Court of the United States ruled in Reno v. Flores, 507 US 292 - 1993 that the ..."Similarly, "the best interests of the child" is not the legal standard that governs parents' or guardians' exercise of their custody: So long as certain minimum requirements of child care are met...". In order for the court to invade on the custody or control of fit parent or guardian "harm" to the child needs to be established in some way. Absent the establishment of that harm a constitutional violation would not be taking place.

In some situations, the parties may have submitted their dispute to formal arbitration proceedings. Such proceedings, whether judicial or quasi-judicial, cannot displace the supervisory power of the court in the exercise of its parens patriae function to the child. To the extent that such an award conflicts with the best interests of the child, the courts will treat it as void in respect of the child, even though it might be binding on the parents. The test of the best interests of the child can always be the basis of a challenge by a parent, grandparent, an interested relative, or the child acting through a friend.

Thus, for example, the spouses might already have been through a religious form of divorce known as the get before the Beth Din, the Jewish rabbinical court, which included provision for the children. Even though there might appear to be a grant of custody in absolute terms by this court, public policy always requires that it can be reviewed by a secular court and, if the state court is of the view that it is not in the best interests of the child, it will be set aside (see Stanley G. v. Eileen G. New York Law Journal, 10-13-94, P.22, Col.6, Sup. Ct., NY Co.).

Within the EU, the right of the child to be heard in any proceedings is a fundamental right provided in Article 24 Charter of Fundamental Rights of the European Union. The views of the child shall be considered on matters which concern them in accordance with their age and maturity. It also provides that the child's best interest shall be the primary consideration in all actions relating to children, whether taken by public authorities or private institutions.

The same principles apply to individuals whose mental capacity is impaired and who are being abused by carers or other individuals, whether family members or otherwise. Since these individuals cannot protect themselves, the courts have an inherent jurisdiction to appoint a guardian ad litem for particular proceedings. In English Law, long-term care is arranged through the Court of Protection.

In US federal courts

The concept of the parens patriae suit has been greatly expanded in the United States federal courts beyond those that existed in England.

In Louisiana v. Texas, the State of Louisiana brought suit to enjoin officials of the State of Texas from so administering the Texas quarantine regulations as to prevent Louisiana merchants from sending goods into Texas. The US Supreme Court recognized that Louisiana was attempting to sue, not because of any particular injury to a particular business of the state, but as parens patriae for all its citizens. While the Court found that parens patriae could not properly be invoked in that case, the propriety and utility of parens patriae suits were clearly recognized, thus setting a precedent. Thus, in a series of cases after Louisiana v. Texas the Supreme Court followed that precedent to allow states to sue as parens patriae:

 Missouri v. Illinois, 180 U.S. 208 (1901) (holding that Missouri was permitted to sue Illinois and a Chicago sanitation district on behalf of Missouri citizens to enjoin the discharge of sewage into the Mississippi River);
 Kansas v. Colorado, 206 U.S. 46 (1907) (holding that Kansas was permitted to sue as parens patriae to enjoin the diversion of water from an interstate stream);
 Georgia v. Tennessee Copper Co., 206 U.S. 230 (1907) (holding that Georgia was entitled to sue to enjoin fumes from a copper plant across the state border from injuring land in five Georgia counties);
 New York v. New Jersey, 256 U.S. 296 (1921) (holding that New York could sue to enjoin the discharge of sewage into the New York harbor);
 Pennsylvania v. West Virginia, 262 U.S. 553 (1923) (holding that Pennsylvania might sue to enjoin restraints on the commercial flow of natural gas);
 North Dakota v. Minnesota, 263 U.S. 365 (1923) (holding that Minnesota could sue to enjoin changes in drainage which increase the flow of water in an interstate stream).

The Supreme Court recognized a different kind of parens patriae suit in Georgia v. Pennsylvania R. Co. While the earlier cases were common-law actions to prevent or repair harm to a state's "quasi-sovereign" interests. Georgia now sought relief under the federal antitrust statute, alleging that twenty railroads had conspired to restrain trade and to fix prices in a manner that would favor shippers in other states (particularly northern states) to the detriment of Georgia shippers and the state's economy. The court upheld Georgia's claim as parens patriae with respect to injunctive relief, but did not consider whether the antitrust laws also authorized damages for an injury to the state's economy, because the ICC's approval of the challenged rates barred any damage recovery.

Then, three decades later, in Hawaii v. Standard Oil Co., the court considered a generally similar damages action Hawaii brought under the antitrust laws for damages to its general economy resulting from a price fix by four oil companies. The court held that the state could sue as parens patriae only for injunctive relief and not for damages. Its citizens would have to sue individually for damages.

In Massachusetts v. EPA, a group of states (mostly coastal states) sought to sue the EPA to require it to regulate greenhouse gas emissions because they were causing global warming and rising sea levels. "These rising seas have already begun to swallow Massachusetts' coastal land." The court stated:

Therefore, states such as Massachusetts had standing as parens patriae to sue EPA to seeks to require it to regulate to protect their coastlines. The Court held that EPA would have to consider the matter and give a reasoned explanation of whatever its decision on the merits would be.

In Pennsylvania v. Mid-Atlantic Toyota Distributors, Inc., the Fourth Circuit held that several state attorney generals were proper parens patriae plaintiffs to sue a group of car dealers for price fixing, in order to recover damages for their citizen injured by overcharges. The court held that because plaintiffs were authorized to pursue antitrust litigation against defendants on behalf of their states' natural-person residents under both 15 U.S.C. §§ 15c-15h and state laws and constitutions, they could sue on behalf of their citizens.

The relation of parens patriae suits brought under state law to the federal Class Action Fairness Act is an unclear issue with implications related to American federalism.

Animals 
Supreme Court of India invoked the doctrine of parens patriae in Animal Welfare Board Of India vs A. Nagaraja & Ors, the court observed, "PCA Act (Prevention of Cruelty to Animals Act),  is a welfare legislation which has to be construed bearing in mind the purpose and object of the Act and the Directive Principles of State Policy. It is trite law that, in the matters of welfare legislation, the provisions of law should be liberally construed in favour of the weak and infirm. Court also should be vigilant to see that benefits conferred by such remedial and welfare legislation are not defeated by subtle devices. Court has also a duty under the doctrine of parens patriae to take care of the rights of animals, since they are unable to take care of themselves as against human beings."

See also
Child custody
in loco parentis
Joint custody
Qui tam
Pater Patriae
Private attorney general

Notes

References

Further reading
Suing the Tobacco and Lead Pigment Industries: Government Litigation as Public Health Prescription by Donald G. Gifford. Ann Arbor, University of Michigan Press, 2010. 
Antitrust Parens Patriae Amendments: Hearings Before the Subcommittee on Monopolies and Commercial Law of the Committee on the Judiciary, House of Representatives, Ninety-fourth Congress, First Session on H.R. 38 and H.R. 2850 ... February 20 and March 6, 1975. United States, U.S. Government Printing Office, 1975.
Sosin, Michael. Parens Patriae and Dispositions in Juvenile Courts. United States: University of Wisconsin, 1978.

Latin legal terminology
Legal procedure
Child custody